A variety of processes, equipment, and materials are used in the production of a three-dimensional object via additive manufacturing. 3D printing is also known as additive manufacturing, therefore the numerous available 3D printing process tend to be additive in nature with a few key differences in the technologies and the materials used in this process.

Some of the different types of physical transformations which are used in 3D printing include melt extrusion, light polymerization, continuous liquid interface production and sintering.

Types of 3D printing processes
There are many different 3D printing processes, that can be grouped into seven categories:

 Vat photopolymerization
 Material jetting
 Binder jetting
 Powder bed fusion
 Material extrusion
 Directed energy deposition
 Sheet lamination

Each process and piece of equipment has pros and cons associated with it. These usually involve aspects such as speed, costs, versatility with respect to feedstock material, geometrical limitations and tolerances, as well as a mechanical and appearance properties of the products such as strength, texture and color.

The variety of processes and equipment allows for numerous uses by amateurs and professionals alike. Some lend themselves better toward industry use (in this case the term Additive Manufacturing is preferred) whereas others make 3D printing accessible to the average consumer. Some printers are large enough to fabricate buildings whilst others tend to micro and nanoscale sized objects and in general many different technologies can be exploited to physically produce the designed objects.

Processes 
Several 3D printing processes have been invented since the late 1970s. The printers were originally large, expensive, and highly limited in what they could produce.

A large number of additive processes are now available. The main differences between processes are in the way layers are deposited to create parts and in the materials that are used. Some methods melt or soften the material to produce the layers, for example. selective laser melting (SLM) or direct metal laser sintering (DMLS), selective laser sintering (SLS), fused deposition modeling (FDM), or fused filament fabrication (FFF), while others cure liquid materials using different sophisticated technologies, such as stereolithography (SLA). With laminated object manufacturing (LOM), thin layers are cut to shape and joined (e.g., paper, polymer, metal). Particle Deposition using inkjet technology prints layers of material in the form of individual drops. Each drop of Solid Ink from Hot-melt material actually prints one particle or one object. Color Hot-melt inks print individual drops of CMYK on top of each other to produce a single color object with 1-3 layers melted together. Complex 3D models are printed with many overlapping drops fused together into layers as defined by the sliced CAD file. Inkjet technology allows 3D models to be solid or open cell structures as defined by the 3D printer inkjet print configuration.  Each method has its own advantages and drawbacks, which is why some companies offer a choice of powder and polymer for the material used to build the object. Others sometimes use standard, off-the-shelf business paper as the build material to produce a durable prototype. The main considerations in choosing a machine are generally speed, costs of the 3D printer, of the printed prototype, choice and cost of the materials, and color capabilities.

Printers that work directly with metals are generally expensive. However less expensive printers can be used to make a mold, which is then used to make metal parts.

Material jetting 
A nozzle with liquid material can be drawn over an absorbent surface to wick out material, electrostatically pulled from a larger jet orifice,  pressurized to stream material or fluid pressure surged to expel short burst of fluid in the form of spray or individual drops. A fountain pen with nib tip is an example of wicking material. A hose is an example of streaming fluid. A pump short burst is an example of drop or spray ejection.

Nozzles can be made of any material and can be single nozzle with one fluid chamber or multi-nozzle with single or multi-fluid chambers. Today's inkjet printer products can be any variation of these inkjet styles.

Ink material for inkjets only needs to be a low enough viscosity to allow the fluid to pass through the nozzle opening. Materials can be melted to be liquid. These are called Hot-melt inks. In all cases the inkjet inks must be three-dimensional on the printed surface to produce a Z height component for a 3D object.

Inkjet was pioneered by Teletype which introduced the electrostatic pull Inktronic teleprinter in 1966. The printer had 40 jets that offered a break-through speed of 120 characters per second.

Continuous inkjets were popular in the 1950-1960's before Drop-On-Demand inkjets were invented in 1972. Continuous three-dimensional inks were wax based and low temperature metal alloy's. Printing with these Hot-melt inks produced alpha-numeric characters that were solid and 3D like but no one recognized them as 3D printing. In 1971, A  young engineer, Johannes Gottwald patented a Liquid metal Recorder that printed large characters in metal for signage but Teletype Corp ignored the discovery.  Braille was printed with wax inks but never commercialized in the 1960s.

Drop-On-Demand (DOD) inkjets were invented in 1972 using piezoelectric "squeeze" technology to pump out one drop per squeeze. Only water-based inks were used in these early DOD jets. Experimentation was done with many orifice shapes, diameters and multiple nozzle holes per inkjet tube. Single nozzle inkjets were called "Alpha Jets" at Exxon Office Systems where printing was researched by many early inventors who were hired to improve printing. The Alpha jet was rejected for being too complex. Multi-jet printheads were designed and incorporated by this group.

A small company in New Hampshire, R.H. Research, owned by Robert Howard researched printing from 1982 -1983 and decided the single-nozzle inkjet was a possible fit and he then contacted an inventor at Exxon who named Al Hock as a good choice for this project. Al Hock invited Tom Peer and Dave Lutz to join him in New Hampshire to look into this new venture and they accepted the job offer. Dave Lutz contacted two jet people still at Exxon, Jim and Kathy McMahon and they also accepted offers to be founders in this venture later to be named Howtek, Inc. Within a few months the Alpha jets made by the new Howtek team were working fine. Howtek management chose to change the glass nozzles to Tefzel based on the inkjet test results. Tefzel allowed the inkjet to work at high temperature with the new Thermoplastic Hot-melt inks and run with no vibrations in the nozzle structure to generate stray drops. Each squeeze produced one drop over a frequency range o 1–16,000 drops per second. The nozzles were manufacturable and the Pixelmaster was born. There were 32 inkjet single nozzles per printhead, printing 4 colors (8 jets per color) CMYK. The mechanism was a printhead rotating at 121 rpm and placing uniform size and shaped drops precisely in place as subtractive color text and image printing for the graphics industry. This technology of hot-melt inks printing layers of CMYK was a precursor to a 3D patent by Richard Helinski.  A few years later(1993) the patent was licensed first by Sanders Prototype, Inc.,(Renamed Solidscape, Inc) a manufacturer of the first desktop Rapid Prototype printer in the industry, the Modelmaker 6 Pro.  This printer and newer products use these Howtek style inkjets and thermoplastic inks. Models printed with the Thermoplastic were perfect for investment casting with no ash during burnout. Thermoplastic ink drop printing is accurate and precise giving high quality surface finish models popular with jewelers and detail sensitive CAD designers. The Howtek inkjets designed to print a page in 4 minutes were now printing in some case for 4 days straight. The first printer was sold in 1993 to Hitchner Corporations, Metal Casting Technology R&D group where they printer golf club heads and parts for automobile engines.

Material extrusion 

Fused filament fabrication (FFF), also known under the trademarked term fused deposition modeling (FDM), derives from automatic polymeric foil hot air welding system, hot-melt gluing and automatic gasket deposition. Such principle has been further developed by S. Scott Crump in the late 1980s and was commercialized in 1990 by Stratasys. After the patent on this technology expired, a large open-source development community developed and both commercial and DIY variants utilizing this type of 3D printer appeared known as the RepRap project (for self-replicating rapid prototyper). As a result, the price of this technology has dropped by two orders of magnitude since its creation, and it has become the most common form of 3D printing.

In fused deposition modeling, the model or part is produced by extruding small beads or streams of material which harden immediately to form layers. A filament of thermoplastic or other low melting point material or mixture is fed into an extrusion nozzle head (3D printer extruder), where the filament is heated to its melting temperature and extruded onto a build table. More recently, fused pellet deposition (or fused particle deposition) has been developed, where particles or pellets of plastic replace the need to use filament. The nozzle head heats the material and turns the flow on and off. Typically stepper motors or servo motors are employed to move the extrusion head and adjust the flow. The printer usually has 3 axes of motion. A computer-aided manufacturing (CAM) software package is used to generate the G-Code that is sent to a microcontroller which controls the motors.

Plastic is the most common material for such printing.  Various polymers may be used, including acrylonitrile butadiene styrene (ABS), polycarbonate (PC), polylactic acid (PLA), high-density polyethylene (HDPE), PC/ABS, polyphenylsulfone (PPSU) and high impact polystyrene (HIPS). In general, the polymer is in the form of a filament fabricated from virgin resins. There are multiple projects in the open-sourced community aimed at processing post-consumer plastic waste into filament. These involve machines used to shred and extrude the plastic material into filament such as recyclebots. Additionally, fluoropolymers such as PTFE tubing are used in the process due to the material's ability to withstand high temperatures. This ability is especially useful in transferring filaments.

Metal and glass may both be used for 3-D printing as well, though they are much more expensive and generally used for works of art. However, the development of WAAM (wire arc additive manufacturing) has reduced the costs of metal 3-D printing.

FDM is somewhat restricted in the variation of shapes that may be fabricated. For example, FDM usually cannot produce stalactite-like structures, since they would be unsupported during the build. Otherwise, a thin support must be designed into the structure, which can be broken away during finishing. Usually, the software that converts the 3D model into a set of flat layers, called slicer, takes care of the addition of these supports and some other resources to allow the fabrication of this kind of shapes.

Powder bed fusion 

Another 3D printing approach is the selective fusing of materials in a granular bed. The technique fuses parts of the layer and then moves upward in the working area, adding another layer of granules and repeating the process until the piece has built up. This process uses the unfused media to support overhangs and thin walls in the part being produced, which reduces the need for temporary auxiliary supports for the piece. For example, in selective heat sintering, a thermal printhead applies heat to layers of powdered thermoplastic; when a layer is finished, the powder bed moves down, and an automated roller adds a new layer of material which is sintered to form the next cross-section of the model; using a less intense thermal printhead instead of a laser, makes this a cheaper solution than using lasers, and can be scaled down to desktop sizes.

Laser sintering techniques include selective laser sintering (SLS), with both metals and polymers (e.g., PA, PA-GF, Rigid GF, PEEK, PS, Alumide, Carbonmide, elastomers), and direct metal laser sintering (DMLS).

Selective Laser Sintering (SLS) was developed and patented by Dr. Carl Deckard and Dr. Joseph Beaman at the University of Texas at Austin in the mid-1980s, under sponsorship of DARPA. A similar process was patented without being commercialized by R. F. Housholder in 1979.

Selective laser melting (SLM) does not use sintering for the fusion of powder granules but will completely melt the powder using a high-energy laser to create fully dense materials in a layer-wise method that has mechanical properties similar to those of conventional manufactured metals.

Electron beam melting (EBM) is a similar type of additive manufacturing technology for metal parts (e.g. titanium alloys). EBM manufactures parts by melting metal powder layer by layer with an electron beam in a high vacuum. Unlike metal sintering techniques that operate below melting point, EBM parts are void-free.

Binder jetting 
The binder jetting 3D printing technique is the deposition of a binding adhesive agent onto layers of material, usually powdered. The materials can be ceramic-based or metal. This method is also known as inkjet 3D printing system. To produce the piece, the printer builds the model using a head that moves over the platform base and deposits, one layer at a time, by spreading a layer of powder (plaster, or resins) and printing a binder in the cross-section of the part using an inkjet-like process. This is repeated until every layer has been printed. This technology allows the printing of full color prototypes, overhangs, and elastomer parts. The strength of bonded powder prints can be enhanced with wax or thermoset polymer impregnation.

Stereolithography 

 The Stereolithography (SLA) process is based on light curing (photopolymerization) of liquid materials into a solid shape; it was patented in 1986 by Chuck Hull.

In this process a vat of liquid polymer is exposed to controlled lighting (like a laser or a digital light projector) under safelight conditions. Most commonly the exposed liquid polymer hardens through cross-linking driven by the addition reaction of carbon carbon double bonds in acrylates.  Polymerization occurs when photopolymers are exposed to light when photopolymers contain chromophores, otherwise, the addition of molecules that are photosensitive are utilized to react with the solution to begin polymerization. Polymerization of monomers lead to cross-linking, which creates a polymer. Through these covalent bonds, the property of the solution is changed. The build plate then moves down in small increments and the liquid polymer is again exposed to light. The process repeats until the model has been built. The liquid polymer is then drained from the vat, leaving the solid model. The EnvisionTEC Perfactory is an example of a DLP rapid prototyping system.

Inkjet printer systems like the Objet PolyJet system spray photopolymer materials onto a build tray in ultra-thin layers (between 16 and 30 μm) until the part is completed. Each photopolymer layer is cured with UV light after it is jetted, producing fully cured models that can be handled and used immediately, without post-curing. The gel-like support material, which is designed to support complicated geometries, is removed by hand and water jetting. It is also suitable for elastomers. There is another type of inkjet printing system available in the market that can print a photopolymer in a layer-by-layer manner, with intermediate UV curing, to produce ophthalmic corrective lenses. No support structures are required in this case, as ophthalmic lenses do not need overhangs. Luxexcel, a Dutch company, has commercialized this technology and printing platform. 
 
Ultra-small features can be made with the 3D micro-fabrication technique used in multiphoton photopolymerisation. This approach uses a focused laser to trace the desired 3D object into a block of gel. Due to the nonlinear nature of photo excitation, the gel is cured to a solid only in the places where the laser was focused while the remaining gel is then washed away. Feature sizes of under 100 nm are easily produced, as well as complex structures with moving and interlocked parts.

Yet another approach uses a synthetic resin that is solidified using LEDs.

In Mask-image-projection-based stereolithography, a 3D digital model is sliced by a set of horizontal planes. Each slice is converted into a two-dimensional mask image. The mask image is then projected onto a photocurable liquid resin surface and light is projected onto the resin to cure it in the shape of the layer. The technique has been used to create objects composed of multiple materials that cure at different rates. In research systems, the light is projected from below, allowing the resin to be quickly spread into uniform thin layers, reducing production time from hours to minutes. Commercially available devices such as Objet Connex apply the resin via small nozzles.

Continuous liquid interface production (CLIP) is another form of additive manufacturing that uses the DLP based photo polymerization process to create smooth-sided solid objects of a wide variety of shapes.  The continuous process of CLIP begins with a pool of liquid photopolymer resin. Part of the pool bottom is transparent to ultraviolet light (the "window"). Like DLP systems before it, ultraviolet light beam shines through the window, illuminating the precise cross-section of the object. The light causes the resin to solidify. The object rises slowly enough to allow resin to flow under and maintain contact with the bottom of the object. CLIP is different from traditional DLP processes, due to an oxygen-permeable membrane which lies below the resin, creating a "dead zone" (persistent liquid interface) preventing the resin from attaching to the window (photopolymerization is inhibited between the window and the polymerizer).

Unlike stereolithography, the printing process is considered continuous by its founders and considerably faster than traditional DLP processes, enabling the production of parts in minutes instead of hours.

Recently, the use of stereolithographic 3D printing techniques has been developed further to allow for the additive manufacturing of ceramic materials. Successful 3D printing of ceramics using stereolithography is achieved through the photopolymerisation of preceramic polymers to yield silicon based ceramics of a class known more widely as polymer derived ceramics, including silicon carbide and silicon oxycarbide.

Computed axial lithography 
Computed axial lithography is a method for 3D printing based on reversing the principle of computed tomography (CT) to create prints in photo-curable resin. It was developed by a collaboration between the University of California, Berkeley with Lawrence Livermore National Laboratory. Unlike other methods of 3D printing it does not build models through depositing layers of material like fused deposition modelling and stereolithography, instead it creates objects using a series of 2D images projected onto a cylinder of resin. It is notable for its ability to build objects much more quickly than other methods using resins and the ability to embed objects within the prints.

Liquid additive manufacturing 
Liquid additive manufacturing (LAM) is an additive manufacturing technique which deposits a liquid or highly viscous material (e.g. Liquid Silicone Rubber) onto a build surface to create an object, which is then vulcanised using heat to harden it. The process was originally created by Adrian Bowyer and was then built upon by German RepRap.

Lamination 
In some printers, paper can be used as the build material, resulting in a lower cost to print. During the 1990s some companies marketed printers that cut cross-sections out of special adhesive coated paper using a carbon dioxide laser and then laminated them together.

In 2005 Mcor Technologies Ltd developed a different process using ordinary sheets of office paper, a tungsten carbide blade to cut the shape, and selective deposition of adhesive and pressure to bond the prototype.

There are also a number of companies selling printers that print laminated objects using thin plastic and metal sheets.

Ultrasonic Consolidation (UC) or Ultrasonic Additive Manufacturing (UAM) is a low temperature additive manufacturing or 3D printing technique for metals.

Directed Energy Deposition (DED)

Powder-fed directed-energy deposition 
In powder-fed directed-energy deposition, a high-power laser is used to melt metal powder supplied to the focus of the laser beam. The laser beam typically travels through the center of the deposition head and is focused to a small spot by one or more lenses. The build occurs on an X-Y table which is driven by a tool path created from a digital model to fabricate an object layer by layer. The deposition head is moved up vertically as each layer is completed. Some systems even make use of 5-axis or 6-axis systems (i.e. articulated arms) capable of delivering material on the substrate (a printing bed, or a pre-existing part) with few to no spatial access restrictions. Metal powder is delivered and distributed around the circumference of the head or can be split by an internal manifold and delivered through nozzles arranged in various configurations around the deposition head. A hermetically sealed chamber filled with inert gas or a local inert shroud gas (sometimes both combined) are often used to shield the melt pool from atmospheric oxygen, to limit oxidation and better control the material properties. The powder fed directed energy process is similar to Selective Laser Sintering, but the metal powder is projected only where material is being added to the part at that moment. The laser beam is used to heat up and create a "melt pool" on the substrate, in which the new powder is injected quasi-simultaneously. The process supports a wide range of materials including titanium, stainless steel, aluminum, tungsten, and other specialty materials as well as composites and functionally graded material. The process can not only fully build new metal parts but can also add material to existing parts for example for coatings, repair, and hybrid manufacturing applications. LENS (Laser Engineered Net Shaping), which was developed by Sandia National Labs, is one example of the Powder Fed - Directed Energy Deposition process for 3D printing or restoring metal parts.

Metal wire processes 
Laser-based wire-feed systems, such as Laser Metal Deposition-wire (LMD-w), feed wire through a nozzle that is melted by a laser using inert gas shielding in either an open environment (gas surrounding the laser), or in a sealed chamber. Electron beam freeform fabrication uses an electron beam heat source inside a vacuum chamber.

It is also possible to use conventional gas metal arc welding attached to a 3D stage to 3-D print metals such as steel, bronze and aluminum.  Low-cost open source RepRap-style 3-D printers have been outfitted with Arduino-based sensors and demonstrated reasonable metallurgical properties from conventional welding wire as feedstock.

Selective Powder Deposition (SPD) 
In selective powder deposition, build and support powders are selectively deposited into a crucible, such that the build powder takes the shape of the desired object and support powder fills the rest of the volume in the crucible. Then an infill material is applied, such that it comes in contact with the build powder.  Then the crucible is fired up in a kiln at the temperature above the melting point of the infill, but below the melting points of the powders. When the infill melts, it soaks the build powder. But it doesn't soak the support powder, because the support powder is chosen to be such that it is not wettable by the infill.  If at the firing temperature, the atoms of the infill material and the build powder are mutually defusable, such as in case of copper powder and zinc infill, then the resulting material will be a uniform mixture of those atoms, in this case, bronze.​ But if the atoms are not mutually defusable, such as in case of ​tungsten and copper at 1100°C, then the resulting material will be a​ composite.​ To prevent shape distortion, the firing temperature must be below the solidus temperature of the resulting alloy.

Printers

Industry use 

As of October 2012, additive manufacturing systems were on the market that ranged from $2,000 to $500,000 in price and were employed in industries including aerospace, architecture, automotive, defense, and medical replacements, among many others. As of 2018, 3-D printers have dropped in cost to as little $100 and low-cost higher quality desktop printers are approximately $2500. These types of devices are used widely in industry for prototyping, jig making, fixturing, fixing small custom components, and even additive manufacturing of actual products.

In addition, higher end 3-D printers have now become relatively common for production and additive manufacturing. For example, General Electric uses the high-end model to build parts for turbines. Many of these systems are used for rapid prototyping, before mass production methods are employed.  Volkswagen uses 3D printers on their assembly lines to print tooling, jigs and fixtures. They estimate that 3D printers save 250,000 EURO per year in costs. One report estimates that almost 75% of desktop 3D printers made are used in industry and not by consumers.

Military and defense are also incorporating the use of 3D printers. The Royal Netherlands Air Force is using desktop 3D printers at their Woensdrecht Air Force Base to make fixtures and alignment tools. In the United States, the Hill Air Force base is using 3D printed parts in repair of fighter jets.

Higher education has proven to be a major buyer of desktop and professional 3D printers.  Significant desktop 3D printer purchases by both K-12 and universities helped sustain a desktop 3D printer market that had problems in 2015–2016.  As higher education is the home to research, 3D printing is being used to fabricate equipment to further research and hold down costs. For example, chemists can 3D print flow reactor systems that would otherwise be too costly to purchase. The UCL School of Pharmacy in the UK created a modular flow reactor system for chemical synthesis that can easily be 3D printed in laboratories around the world at low cost. Libraries around the world have also become locations to house smaller 3D printers for educational and community access.

Consumer use 

Several projects and companies are making efforts to develop affordable 3D printers for home desktop use. Much of this work has been driven by and targeted at DIY/Maker/enthusiast/early adopter communities, with additional ties to the academic and hacker communities.

RepRap Project is one of the longest running projects in the desktop category. The RepRap project aims to produce a free and open source hardware (FOSH) 3D printer, whose full specifications are released under the GNU General Public License, which is capable of replicating itself by printing many of its own (plastic) parts to create more machines. RepRaps have already been shown to be able to print circuit boards and metal parts. The most popular 3D printer in the world is the Prusa i3, a RepRap printer.

Because of the FOSH aims of RepRap, many related projects have used their design for inspiration, creating an ecosystem of related or derivative 3D printers, most of which are also open-source designs. The availability of these open-source designs means that variants of 3D printers are easy to invent. The quality and complexity of printer designs, however, as well as the quality of kit or finished products, varies greatly from project to project. This rapid development of open source 3D printers is gaining interest in many spheres as it enables hyper-customization and the use of public domain designs to fabricate open source appropriate technology. This technology can also assist initiatives in sustainable development since technologies are easily and economically made from resources available to local communities.

The cost of 3D printers has decreased dramatically since about 2010, with machines that used to cost $20,000 now costing less than $1,000. For instance, as of 2013, several companies and individuals are selling parts to build various RepRap designs, with prices starting at about  / . The open source Fab@Home project has developed printers for general use with anything that can be squirted through a nozzle, from chocolate to silicone sealant and chemical reactants. Printers following the project's designs have been available from suppliers in kits or in pre-assembled form since 2012 at prices in the US$2000 range. Several new 3D printers are aimed at the small, inexpensive market including the mUVe3D and Lumifold. Rapide 3D has designed a professional grade crowdsourced 3D-printer costing $1499 which has no fumes nor constant rattle during use. The 3Doodler, "3D printing pen", raised $2.3 million on Kickstarter with the pens selling at $99, though the 3D Doodler has been criticized for being more of a crafting pen than a 3D printer.

As the costs of 3D printers have come down, they are becoming more appealing financially to use for self-manufacturing of personal products. In addition, 3D printing products at home may reduce the environmental impacts of manufacturing by reducing material use and distribution impacts.

In addition, several RecycleBots such as the commercialized Filastruder have been designed and fabricated to convert waste plastic, such as shampoo containers and milk jugs, into inexpensive RepRap filament. There is some evidence that using this approach of distributed recycling is better for the environment.

The development and hyper-customization of the RepRap-based 3D printers has produced a new category of printers suitable for small business and consumer use. Manufacturers such as Solidoodle, Robo 3D, RepRapPro and Pirx 3D have introduced models and kits priced at less than $1,000, thousands less than they were in September 2012. Depending on the application, the print resolution and speed of manufacturing lies somewhere between a personal printer and an industrial printer. A list of printers with pricing and other information is maintained. Most recently, delta robots, like the TripodMaker, have been utilized for 3D printing to increase fabrication speed further. For delta 3D printers, due to its geometry and differentiation movements, the accuracy of the print depends on the position of the printer head.

Some companies are also offering software for 3D printing, as a support for hardware manufactured by other companies.

Large 3D printers 
Large 3D printers have been developed for industrial, education, and demonstrative uses. A large delta-style 3D printer was built in 2014 by SeeMeCNC. It also uses plastic pellets as the raw material instead of the typical plastic filaments used in other 3D printers.

Another type of large printer is Big Area Additive Manufacturing (BAAM). The goal is to develop printers that can produce a large object in high speed. A BAAM machine of Cincinnati Incorporated can produce an object at the speeds 200-500 times faster than typical 3D printers available in 2014.

See also Construction 3D printing

Microscale and nanoscale 3D printing 
Microelectronic device fabrication methods can be employed to perform the 3D printing of nanoscale-size objects. Such printed objects are typically grown on a solid substrate, e.g. silicon wafer, to which they adhere after printing as they are too small and fragile to be manipulated post-construction.

In one technique, 3D nanostructures can be printed by physically moving a dynamic stencil mask during the material deposition process, somewhat analogous to the extrusion method of traditional 3D printers.  Programmable-height nanostructures with resolutions as small as 10 nm have been produced in this fashion, by metallic physical vapor deposition Mechanicalpiezo-actuator controlled stencil mask having a milled nanopore in a silicon nitride membrane.

Another method enhances the photopolymerization process on a much smaller scale, using finely-focused lasers controlled by adjustable mirrors.  This method has produced objects with feature resolutions of 100 nm. Micron wide, millimetre long copper wires have also been printed using lasers.

References

Further reading
 Beaumont Newhall (May 1958) "Photosculpture," Image, 7 (5) : 100–105 
 François Willème, "Photo-sculpture," U.S. Patent no. 43,822 (August 9, 1864). Available on-line at: 
 François Willème (May 15, 1861) "La sculpture photographique", Le Moniteur de la photographie, p. 34.

See also
 3D printing
 Applications of 3D printing
 Construction 3D printing
 List of 3D printer manufacturers